Stoffregen is a surname. Notable people with the surname include:

Elizabeth Stoffregen May (1907–2011), American economist, academic, and advocate
Jean Stoffregen (1919–2008), American lawyer
Kirsten Stoffregen Petersen (1932–2017), Danish nun

Surnames of German origin